Iceberg Lake is located in Glacier National Park, in the U. S. state of Montana. Mount Wilbur is south and Iceberg Peak is west of Iceberg Lake. A popular day hike destination, Iceberg Lake is a  hike from the Swiftcurrent Auto Camp Historic District.

See also
List of lakes in Glacier County, Montana

References

Lakes of Glacier National Park (U.S.)
Lakes of Glacier County, Montana